Karl-Günther von Hase (15 December 1917 – 9 May 2021) was a German diplomat and Secretary of state. As head of the Press and Information Office of the Federal Government, he served as spokesman of government under three chancellors. He was ambassador to the United Kingdom from 1970 to 1977. He was then Director General of the ZDF, a German public-service television broadcaster, retiring in 1982.

Life 
Hase was born in Gut Wangern, Breslau, Silesia, Prussia, Germany (now Gmina Żórawina, Poland). His father, Günther von Hase (1881–1948) was a Prussian major and a police officer from 1920 to 1934, ending his career as a Oberst der Landespolizei and Stabschef in Berlin. His mother was Ina von Hase née Hicketier (1882–1972). He attended the humanistic  in Berlin, completing with the Abitur in 1935. He entered a military career as a Fahnenjunker of the Artillerieregiment 19 Hannover / Celle, studying at the Kriegsschule Potsdam in 1936/37.

Hase served in the Wehrmacht in World War II on fronts in Poland, France, Russia (where he was wounded in 1942), and Italy. He was a major in the Generalstab. After his uncle Paul von Hase participated in the 20 July plot and was executed, he was dismissed from the Generalstab and sent to Schneidemühl, now in Poland. He was a prisoner of war in Russia, returning in 1949. 

Hase attended a school for diplomats in Speyer in 1951, which at the time accepted students without a university background. Hase had his first job in the Foreign Office in 1952. In 1958, he became director of its press department, a secretary of state function. From 1961, he was head of the department West II, responsible for the NATO, defense, Great Britain, U.S., Central America and South America, and Africa south of the Sahara.

Hase became director of the press and information office of the Federal Government in 1962, serving as spokesman of the federal government (Regierungssprecher) under chancellors Adenauer, Erhard and Kiesinger. In 1967, he was elected as Intendant of the broadcaster Deutsche Welle, but he was requested by Kiesinger to not accept the position. Instead, he was secretary of state for the Ministry of Defense. In 1969 when a social-liberal coalition ruled, he returned to the foreign office. He served as an ambassador to the United Kingdom from 1970 to 1977.

Hase then became Director General (Intendant) of the ZDF, a German public-service television broadcaster, succeeding its first Intendant, Karl Holzamer. He had little experience with broadcasting, but was a compromise candidate because other candidates could not find a majority; Hase offered diplomatic skills and a vision for the future. He is credited with expanding collaboration with broadcasters internationally during his tenure. Series were begun at the time that have continued to this day, including heute-journal, Wetten, dass..?, and Politbarometer. He promoted technical innovations such as cable television, satellite television, and teletext.

After his retirement, Hase lived with his wife in Bad Godesberg. He was honorary president of the German-English Society, and kept contact with military associations, the foreign office, the ZDF, and the federal press office. Hase turned 100 in December 2017 and died in May 2021 at the age of 103.

Publications 

Hase's publications, all in German, include:

 
 
 
 
 
  (Imprint of Wissenschaftliche Verlagsanstalt zur Pflege Deutschen Sinngutes)
 
 
  (part of the )

Awards 
 Iron Cross (1939)
 2nd Class (28 May 1940)
 1st Class (26 June 1940)
 German Cross in Gold on 11 February 1943 as Hauptmann in the 3./Panzer-Artillerie-Regiment 92
 Knight's Cross of the Iron Cross on 12 February 1945 as Major and general staff officer with the commander of the fortress Schneidemühl (Ia (operations officer) Panzer-Division "Holstein")
 Austrian Grand Decoration of Honour in Gold with Star (1964)
 Honorary Knight Commander of the Order of St Michael and St George (1965)
 Orden wider den tierischen Ernst 1967
 Honorary Knight Grand Cross of the Royal Victorian Order (1972)
 Order of Merit of the Federal Republic of Germany 1982
 Honorary doctorate of the University of Manchester, in Law

Notes

References

Citations

Bibliography

Further reading 
 : 99 Bonner Köpfe, revised edition, Fischer-Bücherei, Frankfurt 1965, pp. 112
 Genealogisches Handbuch des Adels, Adelige Häuser B, vol. XXII, p. 163 (vol. 115 of the complete edition), C. A. Starke Verlag, Limburg 1998,

External links
 

1917 births
2021 deaths
Ambassadors of West Germany to the United Kingdom
Christian Democratic Union of Germany politicians
German centenarians
German prisoners of war in World War II held by the Soviet Union
Grand Crosses with Star and Sash of the Order of Merit of the Federal Republic of Germany
Men centenarians
People from the Province of Silesia
Military personnel from Wrocław
Politicians from Wrocław
Recipients of the Gold German Cross
Recipients of the Grand Decoration with Star for Services to the Republic of Austria
Recipients of the Knight's Cross of the Iron Cross
ZDF people
Honorary Knights Commander of the Order of St Michael and St George
Honorary Knights Grand Cross of the Royal Victorian Order
German Army officers of World War II